Eupithecia molybdaena is a moth in the family Geometridae. It is found in western China (Shaanxi).

The wingspan is about 17 mm. The fore- and hindwings are pale brown.

References

Moths described in 2004
molybdaena
Moths of Asia